Oregon Route 180 is an Oregon state highway running from the community of Eddyville to U.S. Route 20 in Blodgett. OR 180 is known as the Eddyville-Blodgett Highway No. 180 (see Oregon highways and routes).

OR 180 was established in 2002 as part of Oregon's project to assign route numbers to highways that previously were not assigned, and, as of September 2019, was unsigned.

Route description 

OR 180 begins at an intersection with Crystal Creek Loop (formerly US 20) in Eddyville.  It heads east through Nortons, Nashville, and Summit to an intersection with US 20 in Blodgett, where it ends.

History 

OR 180 was assigned to the undesignated part of the Eddyville-Blodgett Highway in 2002.

Major intersections

Related routes 

 U.S. Route 20

References 

 Oregon Department of Transportation, Descriptions of US and Oregon Routes, https://web.archive.org/web/20051102084300/http://www.oregon.gov/ODOT/HWY/TRAFFIC/TEOS_Publications/PDF/Descriptions_of_US_and_Oregon_Routes.pdf, page 27.
 Oregon Department of Transportation, Eddyville-Blodgett Highway No. 180, ftp://ftp.odot.state.or.us/tdb/trandata/maps/slchart_pdfs_1980_to_2002/Hwy180_2000.pdf

180
Transportation in Benton County, Oregon
Transportation in Lincoln County, Oregon